James E. Kraft Jr. is a retired United States Army major general who was the Deputy Commanding General of the XVIII Airborne Corps. Previously, he was the Director of Operations of the United Nations Command, ROK/US Combined Forces Command and United States Forces Korea.

References 

</ref>

External links
 

Year of birth missing (living people)
Living people
Place of birth missing (living people)
United States Army generals